Eyjólfur Héðinsson (born 1 January 1985 in Reykjavík) is an Icelandic footballer, who plays as a midfielder for ÍR Reykjavik.

Club career

Early career
Eyjólfur started his senior team career with ÍR in 2001 before transferring to Fylkir in 2003. After the 2006 season, he signed with GAIS.

SønderjyskE
After his contract ended with GAIS at the start of 2011, Eyjólfur went for a trial with SønderjyskE. After a week of trial, he was offered a contract. Eyjólfur granted the offer made by SønderjyskE and signed a contract lasting until June 2013. Eyjólfur was seen by the media as a replacement for Rasmus Hansen who had joined Danish Superliga side Randers FC.

Stjarnan
After 3 years with several injuries and only 10 league matches, it was announced on 18 November 2015, that Eyjólfur would take back home at the end of the year to Iceland, playing for Stjarnan.

References

External links

1985 births
Living people
Eyjolfur Hedinsson
Association football midfielders
Eyjolfur Hedinsson
Eyjolfur Hedinsson
Eyjolfur Hedinsson
Eyjolfur Hedinsson
GAIS players
SønderjyskE Fodbold players
FC Midtjylland players
Eyjolfur Hedinsson
Eyjolfur Hedinsson
Allsvenskan players
Danish Superliga players
Eyjolfur Hedinsson
Eyjolfur Hedinsson
Expatriate footballers in Sweden
Icelandic expatriate sportspeople in Sweden
Expatriate men's footballers in Denmark
Icelandic expatriate sportspeople in Denmark